The 1875 South Australian football season was the thirteenth year of interclub football in South Australia.

Clubs 
The following clubs participated in interclub matches during 1875:

Metropolitan
 Adelaide
 Kensington
 Port Adelaide
 Victorian
 Woodville

Country
 Aldinga
 Gawler
 Kapunda
 Willunga

Junior
 St Peter's College
 South Adelaide
 Prince Alfred College

Metropolitan football matches

May 15

May 29

June 5

June 12

June 19

June 21

June 26

July 3

July 10

July 24

July 31

August 6

August 14

August 21

August 28

Ladder 

In the table below, Senior Results is based only upon games played against senior clubs; the record listed under W-L-D is the record over all matches, including those against country, junior and school teams.

References

1875 in Australian sport
Australian rules football competition seasons
South Australian football season